HMS Abelia was a  that served in the Royal Navy and was built by Harland and Wolff in 1941.

She was launched on 28 November 1940, and was fitted for minesweeping. She served in World War II; her commanding officer for parts of 1943 and 1944 was Lieutenant Orme G. Stuart.

On 9 January 1944 Abelia encountered a U-boat while on convoy escort duty, and moved to attack with depth charges. Abelia was hit and lost her rudder, and the U-boat escaped.

She was sold in 1947 and became the merchant vessel Kraft in 1948. She was renamed Arne Skontorp in 1954. She was eventually scrapped in December 1966.

References

Further reading

External links
HMS Abelia on the Arnold Hague database at convoyweb.org.uk.

 

Flower-class corvettes of the Royal Navy
1940 ships
Ships built in Belfast
Ships built by Harland and Wolff